Adam Jury is a Canadian game designer and graphic designer working in the hobby games industry. He is the co-founder of Posthuman Studios.

History
Adam Jury is a graphic designer. Jury began his career as a freelance writer working with FASA Corporation on the Shadowrun roleplaying game in 2000, and moved to a design and layout role when he began working for Guardians of Order (GoO) full-time in 2002.

Jury took over working on the licensed Big Eyes, Small Mouth supplements in 2002 from Jeff Mackintosh, and Uresia: Grave of Heaven (2003) is one of the earlier books that included art from Jury. In 2004, when GoO began scaling down their operations and output, Jury helped GoO finish and publish some of their last products while returning to work as a freelancer with other publishers

While working as a graphic designer at Catalyst Game Labs, Jury created the game design studio Posthuman Studios in 2009 with Rob Boyle and Shadowrun writer Brian Cross. Jury resigned from Catalyst in March 2010.

Jury works primarily with FanPro on Shadowrun and Classic BattleTech (a revised edition of the classic miniatures game), as well as pursuing a number of original projects.

Awards
Adam Jury has worked on several award-winning or nominated products, including the following:

 Dreaming Cities - nominated for an ENnie Award in 2005
 A Game of Thrones RPG - nominated for ENnie Awards in multiple categories in 2006; Runner-Up for Best Game award.
 Shadowrun, Fourth Edition - winner of ENnie Awards for Best Game and Best Rules in 2006.

Jury was the gaming guest of honor at MechaCon in July 2009.

Notable works
Eclipse Phase, an RPG about transhumanism and existential horror in a post apocalyptic future.
A Game of Thrones RPG
Big Eyes, Small Mouth 3rd edition
Dreaming Cities
Ex Machina RPG
Shadowrun, Fourth Edition
Battletech, Total Warfare
Tri-Stat dX

References

External links
 Official website
 Adam Jury :: Pen & Paper RPG Database archive
 Shadowrun, Fourth Edition Review from Ken Hite

Canadian graphic designers
Canadian video game designers
Living people
Role-playing game designers
Place of birth missing (living people)
Year of birth missing (living people)